Leonard Higson (13 August 1908 – second ¼ 1974) was an English professional rugby league footballer who played in the 1920s, 1930s and 1940s.

Background
Len Higson's birth was registered in Pontefract district, West Riding of Yorkshire, England, and his death aged 65 was registered in Bradford district, West Yorkshire, England.

Playing career

International honours
Len Higson won caps for England while at Wakefield Trinity in 1932 against Wales, and while at Bradford Northern in 1941 against Wales.

County honours
Len Higson won cap(s) for Yorkshire while at Wakefield Trinity.

County Cup Final appearances
Len Higson played left-, i.e. number 8, in Wakefield Trinity's 0-8 defeat by Leeds in the 1932–33 Yorkshire County Cup Final during the 1932–33 season at Fartown Ground, Huddersfield on Saturday 19 November 1932.

Notable tour matches
Len Higson played  left-, i.e. number 8, in Wakefield Trinity's 6-17 defeat by Australia in the 1933–34 Kangaroo tour of Great Britain match during the 1933–34 season at Belle Vue, Wakefield on Saturday 28 October 1933.

Club career
Len Higson made his début for Wakefield Trinity during November 1927, he appears to have scored no drop-goals (or field-goals as they are currently known in Australasia), but prior to the 1974–75 season all goals, whether; conversions, penalties, or drop-goals, scored 2-points, consequently prior to this date drop-goals were often not explicitly documented, therefore '0' drop-goals may indicate drop-goals not recorded, rather than no drop-goals scored. In addition, prior to the 1949–50 season, the archaic field-goal was also still a valid means of scoring points.

Genealogical information
Len Higson was the son of the rugby league footballer; John Higson.

References

External links
Photograph "Len Higson - Len Higson joined Northern in 1935 having previously played for Leeds and Wakefield Trinity. On his retirement in 1947 he joined Northern's coaching staff. - 01/01/1940" at rlhp.co.uk
Photograph "Challenge cup winning side. - The Bradford Northern Challenge Cup winning side of 1944. Northern beat Wigan 8-0 after losing 3-0 away from home in the first leg. - 22/04/1944" at rlhp.co.uk
Photograph "Championship winning team 1945 - Bradford Northern's Championship winning team of 1945. - 01/01/1945" at rlhp.co.uk
Photograph "Team to visit Barrow in the Cup 1946 - The team to visit Barrow in the 1946 Challenge Cup waits to board the coach. - 07/03/1946 - " at rlhp.co.uk

1908 births
1974 deaths
Bradford Bulls players
England national rugby league team players
English rugby league players
Leeds Rhinos players
Rugby league players from Pontefract
Rugby league props
Wakefield Trinity players
Yorkshire rugby league team players